This is a list of notable events relating to the environment in 1986. They relate to environmental law, conservation, environmentalism and environmental issues.

Events
The International Geosphere-Biosphere Programme is launched.
The Quota Management System commences. It is a type of individual fishing quota that is used in New Zealand to manage fish stocks.
Northern river reversal, an ambitious project to divert the flow of the Northern rivers in the Soviet Union, was abandoned, primarily for environmental reasons.

April
The Chernobyl disaster, a catastrophic nuclear accident, occurred at the Chernobyl Nuclear Power Plant in Ukraine.

June
US President Ronald Reagan signed the Safe Drinking Water Act Amendments of 1986

November
The Sandoz chemical spill, a major environmental disaster caused by a fire and its subsequent control, occurred at the Sandoz agrochemical storehouse in Schweizerhalle, Basel-Landschaft, Switzerland, on November 1, 1986. It released toxic agrochemicals into the air and resulted in tons of pollutants entering the Rhine river, turning it red.
The West Coast Accord was signed between government, industry and environmental organisations concerning the conservation forests of the West Coast of New Zealand.

December
The Environment Act 1986 is passed in New Zealand, established the Ministry for the Environment and the Office of the Parliamentary Commissioner for the Environment.

See also

Human impact on the environment
List of environmental issues